Re Denley’s Trust Deed [1969] 1 Ch 373 is an English trusts law case, concerning the policy of the "beneficiary principle". It held that so long as the people benefitting from a trust can at least be said to have a direct and tangible interest, so as to have the locus standi to enforce a trust, it would be valid.

Facts
In 1936 the settlor company, HH Martyn & Co Ltd, from Sunningend Works, Cheltenham, transferred land to trustees to, under clause 2(c), "be maintained and used as and for the purpose of a recreation or sports ground primarily for the benefit of the employees of the company and secondarily for the benefit of such other person or persons (if any) as the trustees may allow to use the same". Clause 2(j) added that the employees would cease entitlement if the number dropped below 75% of them "or if the said land shall at any time cease to be required or to be used by the said employees as a sports ground or if the company shall go into liquidation then the trustees shall ... convey the said land to the General Hospital Cheltenham or as it shall direct." It was argued that this was a non-charitable purpose trust and should fall foul of the beneficiary principle.

The claimants were the trustees. The first defendant was the company, who argued clause 2(j) was void for uncertainty, and if not clause 2(c) was also void, and hence the property would be on resulting trust to the company. The second defendant was an employee representing the others, who argued that clause 2(c) is valid, and if not then clause 2(j) would be void. The third defendants was the Cheltenham Group Hospital Management Committee, which under the National Health Service Act 1946 was successor to the assets of the Cheltenham General Hospital, argued that clause 2(c) is void, and that clause 2(j) is valid, so that they would get the grounds.

Judgment
Goff J held that the trust was valid, because it could be construed as being ultimately for the benefit of people and thus made to work. He said the following.

Goff J applied the list certainty test from IRC v Broadway Cottages Trust [1955] Ch 20, although this would now be superseded given McPhail v Doulton.

See also

English trusts law

Notes

References

English trusts case law
High Court of Justice cases
1969 in British law
1969 in case law